John Alan MacNaughton,  (March 6, 1945 – February 15, 2013) was a Canadian investment banker. He was the chairman of the Business Development Bank of Canada and was the founding president and CEO of the Canada Pension Plan Investment Board.

Biography
MacNaughton was born and raised in Exeter, Ontario, until he left to study at the University of Western Ontario. MacNaughton was the chairman of the Business Development Bank of Canada and of the CNSX stock exchange. He was a director of Nortel Networks Corporation and Nortel Networks Limited. He was the chair of the Independent Nominating Committee of the new Canada Employment Insurance Financing Board.

He served as president and CEO of Burns Fry from 1989 to 1994 and president of Nesbitt Burns from 1994 to 1999. MacNaughton was also a director for TransCanada Corp.

He was the founding president and CEO of the Canada Pension Plan Investment Board from 1999 to 2005.

He was also a member of the Trilateral Commission

In 2004, he was made a Member of the Order of Canada for his "outstanding leadership in the financial services industry as well as in the voluntary and public sectors".

Death 
MacNaughton died on February 15, 2013, at the age of 67 after a lengthy battle with cancer.

References

1945 births
2013 deaths
Canadian chairpersons of corporations
Canadian corporate directors
Canadian financiers
CPP Investment Board people
Directors of Nortel
Members of the Order of Canada